Fathi Yakan (born Fathi Mohamed Anaya, February 9, 1933 – June 13, 2009) was an Islamic cleric who held a seat in the parliament of Lebanon in 1992. He was born in Tripoli.

Life

He was among the pioneers of the Islamic movement in the 1950s and the head of the Islamic Action Front (Lebanon). He is regarded as Islamic Group (Al Jemaah Islamiyah)'s grandfather and leading ideologue. 

He initiated a political effort between Prime Minister Fouad Siniora and his allies on the one hand and the opposition in a bid to end the rule crisis in the wake of the 2006 Israeli war on Lebanon.

Sheikh Yakan was married to Mona Haddad with whom he had established a private Islamic university, Jinan University (Lebanon). He has four daughters and a son. He has authored more than 35 books, some of which were translated into many languages. Yakan died on June 13, 2009 after he was admitted to the Hotel Dieu Hospital a day earlier.

See also
2006–2007 Lebanese political protests

References

Books
Fathi Yakan, To Be A Muslim

External links

Dr. Fathi Yakan Guest CV - IslamOnline.net
Islamic Action Front announces death of its leader Fathi Yakan
Lebanon Bids Farewell to Islamic Action Front Head Fathi Yakan
Lebanese cleric Fathi Yakan died, Islamic Action Front says

1933 births
2009 deaths
20th-century Muslim scholars of Islam
Lebanese Sunni Muslims
Muslim Brotherhood leaders
People from Tripoli, Lebanon
Members of the Parliament of Lebanon
Lebanese people of Turkish descent